Raffelstetten Customs Regulations (Latin: Inquisitio de theloneis Raffelstettensis, literally: "Inquisition on the Raffelstetten Tolls"), is the only legal document regulating customs in Early Medieval Europe. The inquiry was edited in the Monumenta Germaniae Historica (ed. A. Boretius and V. Krause, MGH Capit. 2, no. 253).

The document takes its name from Raffelstetten, a toll-bar on the Danube, a few kilometers downstream from Linz (it is now part of the town of Asten in Austria). There, the Carolingian king Louis the Child promulgated a regulation of toll-bars on his domains, after an inquiry dated between 903 and 906.

The customs regulations are priceless for documenting trade in Eastern Europe of the 9th and 10th centuries. The document makes it clear that Raffelstetten was a place where German slave traders and their Slavic counterparts exchanged goods. The Czech and Rus merchants sold wax, slaves, and horses to German merchants. Salt, weapons, and ornaments were sought by slave trading adventurers.

Perhaps the most striking feature of the regulations is the absence of Charlemagne's denarius, the only coin officially recognized in the Frankish Empire. Instead, the document mentions "skoti", a currency otherwise not attested in Carolingian Europe. It appears that both the name and weight of the "skoti" were borrowed from the Rus.

Vasily Vasilievsky notes that the document, being the first legal act to regulate the trade of the Rus', capped off a long tradition of trade between Germany and Kievan Rus. Alexander Nazarenko suggests that the trade route between Kiev and Regensburg (strata legitima, as it is labeled in the text) was as important in the period as that between Novgorod and Constantinople would be in the tenth century.

Notes

Sources
 George Duby, The Early Growth of the European Economy (1973) pp. 131–2 of English edition
 Vasily Vasilievsky. Древняя торговля Киева с Регенсбургом // ЖМНП, 1888, июль, с. 129.
 Renée Doehaerd, Le Haut Moyen Âge occidental : économies et sociétés, 3e éd. 1990, Paris, PUF, 1971, pp. 257–8 and p. 289 (coll. Nouvelle Clio).
 MGH, Leges, Capitularia regum Francorum, II, ed. by A. Boretius, Hanovre, 1890, pp. 250–2 (available on-line).

Germanic legal codes
Legal history of Germany
Society of Kievan Rus'
Linz-Land District
900s
Customs services
Medieval Latin texts
Economic history of Austria
Carolingian Latin literature
Latin prose texts